Mehrez Ben Ammar is a Tunisian handball coach of the Tunisian national team.

He coached them at the 2015 World Women's Handball Championship.

References

Year of birth missing (living people)
Living people
Tunisian handball coaches
Place of birth missing (living people)